John David Clotworthy Whyte-Melville Foster Skeffington, 14th Viscount Massereene and 7th Viscount Ferrard (born 3 June 1940) is a British peer.

Life and career 

John Skeffington succeeded his father, John Whyte-Melville-Skeffington, 13th Viscount Massereene, in 1992 and regularly attended the House of Lords (where he sat under the title Baron Oriel, his Irish Viscountcies not entitling him to a seat) until the passage of the House of Lords Act 1999 which ended the automatic right for hereditary peers to sit in the House of Lords. Lord Massereene stood unsuccessfully as a UKIP candidate in a House of Lords by-election in 2013.

Educated at Millfield and the Institute Monte Rosa, he served in the Grenadier Guards regiment 1958–1961. He is a major landowner, holds various directorships, and is a stockbroker with M.D.Barnard & Co; member of the London Stock Exchange 1961–1964, and from 1970 to the present. He married in 1970, to Ann Denise Rowlandson. The couple have two sons, including Charles Skeffington (his heir), and one daughter.

Lord Massereene oversaw the sale of Chilham Castle in 1996, the family's ancestral home in Kent; the family seat is now at High Northolme, Salton, North Yorkshire.

Like his father, he is President of the Conservative Monday Club, and was a patron of Right Now!, a magazine edited by Derek Turner.

Sources
The Times and Sunday Times online archives

References

External links

Viscounts in the Peerage of Ireland
People educated at Millfield
1940 births
Living people
English stockbrokers
Grenadier Guards officers
Conservative Party (UK) hereditary peers
UK Independence Party people
Place of birth missing (living people)
Massereene